Richard Morris (born William Richard Stuart Morris; January 30, 1862 – October 11, 1924) was an American opera singer, stage performer, and a silent film actor. Morris was born on January 30, 1862, in Charlestown, Massachusetts.  He was 62 years old when he died in Los Angeles, California on October 11, 1924. Between 1912 and 1924, Richard Morris acted in 59 films.

Early years
William Richard Stuart Morris was born on January 30, 1862, to working-class Irish parents in Charlestown, Massachusetts, the oldest Irish neighborhood in the city of Boston. Some fan magazines claim his birth was January 3, but the neglected zero is apparent. His father was an Irish Immigrant, William A. Morris. His mother was a native of Bostonian Catherine Morris (née Keefe). Since he was the firstborn son in an Irish Catholic family, his parents gave him William's first name, like his father and father before him. 1870 census records list Morris's father as an expressman. The same census record list his mother as a homemaker The Morris family would eventually have eight children, six girls, and two boys.

His early education included spending three years abroad training for the grand opera. No known matriculation records show what type of "training" he received. Upon returning to America, he worked professionally as an opera singer. He performed in various domestic venues in the 1880s.

In 1889, the records show he kept the Charlestown address as his permanent base. His 59-year-old mother died at home in 1898 of Interstitial nephritis.
1900 census shows 36-year-old William RS Morris keeping the same base address as his widowed father and five sisters. All the daughters are single. His 74-year-old father died in 1907 while Morris was touring in Europe.

Stage

27-year-old William Morris started acting with the prestigious  Shakespearean touring company of Booth and Modjeska in 1889. The program on the left exhibits a one-night performance of  Macbeth in Indianapolis, Indiana on April 29, 1890. In the section listing the cast of characters, it shows Mr. W.R.S. Morris in the role of the second witch. The following year, Edwin Booth (1833-1893) suffered a debilitating stroke, effectively ending his stage career. Edwin Booth died of a stroke in 1893.

Later in his stage career, Morris would work with individual Shakespearean touring companies of Lawrence Barrett (1838-1891) and Helena Modjeska (1840-1909). Modjeska suffered a stroke in 1897 but later returned to the stage. Morris eventually hooked up with Shakespearean actress Minna Gale (1868-1944) and her Repertory theatre troupe. Gale, like Morris, had lived in Europe, where she studied music and theater in Paris and Frankfort. Another similarity appeared when they discovered their stage experiences helped their transition to the screen.

In 1906, the 44-year-old Morris returned to the operatic stage. He departed for London and continued to perform on stage until 1909.

Film
In the early 1900s, the American public had an increasing appetite for the latest entertainment - motion pictures.

Lubin

The Lubin Manufacturing Company was an American motion picture company producing silent films from 1896 to 1916. When Richard Morris returned to America from London, he sought work in the burgeoning movie industry. In September 1909, he joined the  Lubin organization based in Philadelphia, Pennsylvania. Richard Morris was 50-years-old when he entered the movie industry, a comparatively late age for those seeking employment in an industry preoccupied with beautiful young people. In his first recorded film for Lubin, Morris played an organ grinder in Little Boy Blue, released on May 6, 1912. No known records exist documenting if Morris acted in any Lubin productions before 1912. It is also unknown when he started using the screen moniker Richard Morris.

Between 1912 and 1914, he would act in 25 films for Lubin, opening with Little Boy Blue and ending with the December 1914 release of A Believer in Dreams. During his stretch at Lubin, he met Lloyd B. Carleton. Carleton signed a Lubin contract in 1911, allowing him to direct both features and shorts. Despite the late introduction, Carleton saw Morris's value as a  character actor, and they made 3 Lubin-produced 2-reelers in 1914.

He remained one of Lloyd B. Carleton's favorite character actors. Between 1914 and 1920, Morris acted in 15 Lloyd B. Carleton-directed films.  Carleton had found a fellow brother from the Eastern stage, whose stage credentials were impeccable. Morris remained with Lubin until July 1914. Carleton left Lubin earlier and gained employment with another movie company in Autumn 1914.

After making more than a thousand motion pictures, the Lubin Manufacturing Company declared bankruptcy on September 1, 1916

Selig and Lasky
In late Summer 1914, Morris traveled once again to London, England. During his stay in London, World War I was flaring up.  On August 4, 1914, the United Kingdom declared war on Germany. Morris returned to American, arriving in New York on November 16, 1914. The ship's manifest lists William R Stuart Morris, born in Charlestown on January 30, 1862. The manifest further states he was single, 52 years old, and residing at 1108 Walnut Street, Philadelphia, Pennsylvania.

Between January and August 1915, Morris returned to making movies and acted in 4 films for various organizations, including Powers Picture Plays and Jesse L. Lasky Feature Play

In 1915, Morris signed a contract with Selig Polyscope based in Chicago, Illinois but having offices in Los Angeles. During his stay with Selig, he was reunited with Lloyd B. Carleton. Between September and December, Morris acted in 4 Carleton-directed short films. Morris's total film output for 1915 was 6 short movies and 2 feature-length. He made 3 more pictures for Selig Polyscope before departing.

Universal

Lloyd Carleton signed a Universal contract in the autumn of 1915. Richard Morris signed a Universal contract in 1916 and permanently moved to Los Angeles, California.

Morris reunited with Lloyd B. Carleton again and acted in the Red Feather feature-length production of A Yoke of Gold released on August 14, 1916. The same film provided an introduction to Emory Johnson. This relationship would prove beneficial in the coming years.

Between August 1916 and December, Morris would act in 7 Lloyd Carleton-directed films. All films were feature-length with the sole exception of the 2-reelerThe Human Gamble. All films would feature Emory Johnson in the lead. The feature-length films were:
A Yoke of Gold Red Feather film released in August
The Unattainable Bluebird film  released in September
Black Friday Red Feather film released in September
Barriers of Society Red Feather film released in October
The Devil's Bondwoman Red Feather film released in November
The Morals of Hilda Red Feather film released in December (his last film for Universal)

1916 would be Morris's glory year in films. He had successfully made the transition from filming 2-reelers to feature-length movies. He would continue to shoot only feature-length films for the remainder of his career.

Other films companies
After he departed from Universal in 1916, his picture output declined. He was an actor in his later 50s looking for work in a youth-obsessed industry. He acted in one film in 1918 and another one in 1919. He made 4 films in 1920, including reuniting with Lloyd Carleton to act in The Amazing Woman.

Emory Johnson connection

In January 1921, Richard Morris turned 59-years-old.  In 1921, Hobart Bosworth productions invited Morris to play the part of Uncle Billy in The Sea Lion. He acted with Hobart Bosworth, Emory Johnson and Bessie Love. It was the only movie Morris filmed in 1921. 

Emory Johnson embarked upon a career as a director in 1922. Johnson's first film was the FBO feature-length production of In the Name of the Law. When Johnson evaluated players for his first movie, Johnson probably recalled Morris had acted in 7 movies with him in 1916. Johnson hired the aging actor to play the role of Dr. Lucus in his first film.

Richard Morris would continue to appear in FBO productions directed by Emory Johnson including  The Third Alarm, The West~Bound Limited, The Mailman and The Spirit of the USA until his untimely death in October 1924.

Alternate names
Richard Morris used many different pseudonyms during his career, including:
Dick Morris
Mr. Richard Morris
Mr. W.R.S. Morris
William Morris
Stuart Morris
William R S Morris

Death
The 1920 census registers Richard Morris as a single 57-year-old lodger living in Los Angeles. His listed occupation is an actor. The Emory Johnson-directed film The Spirit of the USA was released by Film Booking Offices of America on May 18, 1924. It would be Richard Morris's last movie.

On Saturday, October 11, 1924, Richard Stewart Morris died in Los Angeles, California. He was 63 years old. A simple obituary appeared in the Los Angeles Times on October 13, 1924:

MORRIS, Richard Stewart Morris, aged 63 years, a native of Boston, MASS.
Services at 2 pm Tuesday at Le Roy Bagley's parlors, 5440 Hollywood Blvd., 
Rev. Neal Dodd officiating

The funeral was held at the Pierce Brothers LeRoy Bagley Mortuary Hollywood, California with 
"The padre of Hollywood", the Rev. Neal Dodd officiating. That same year, Rev Dodd would become a founding member of a relief fund to aid film workers in need. A brief obituary would appear in The Boston Globe noting the death of William Richard Stuart Morris. Richard Morris was buried in the Los Angeles National Cemetery.

Filmography

References

External links

AFI Catalog Richard Morris

1862 births
1924 deaths
20th-century American male actors
American male actors
American male silent film actors
Irish male silent film actors
Male actors from Massachusetts
Male actors from Boston